Qazaq may refer to:
 Cossacks
 Kazakhs
 Kazakh language, the language spoken by the Kazakhs